Ludford is a civil parish in Shropshire, England.  It contains 24 listed buildings that are recorded in the National Heritage List for England.  Of these, one is listed at Grade I, the highest of the three grades, four are at Grade II*, the middle grade, and the others are at Grade II, the lowest grade.  The parish is to the south of the town of Ludlow, and contains the village of Ludford, and the surrounding countryside.  The listed buildings include houses, cottages, farmhouses and farm buildings, a church, a mill and a weir, a bridge, a row of almshouses, a fives court, a hotel, and a bridge.


Key

Buildings

References

Citations

Sources

Lists of buildings and structures in Shropshire